The 1975 Dutch Grand Prix was a Formula One motor race held at Circuit Zandvoort on 22 June 1975. It was race 8 of 14 in both the 1975 World Championship of Drivers and the 1975 International Cup for Formula One Manufacturers. It was the 24th Dutch Grand Prix. It was held over 75 laps of the four kilometre circuit for a race distance of 318 kilometres.

The race is memorable for one of the greatest underdog victories in Formula One. British driver and future world champion James Hunt won his first Formula One Grand Prix, giving small privateer operation Hesketh Racing the highlight of its six-year history with its first and only Grand Prix win. Hunt drove his Hesketh 308 to a one-second win over the Ferrari 312T of the World Championship points leader, Austrian driver Niki Lauda. Third was taken by Lauda's Ferrari team mate, Swiss driver Clay Regazzoni.

Race summary 

Niki Lauda dominated practice, with teammate Clay Regazzoni joining him on the front row. Jean-Pierre Jarier had a crash and the Maki team's weekend ended abruptly in a cloud of smoke from engine problems. James Hunt had a storming practice to take third place on the grid. On Saturday afternoon, weather conditions meant practice times would not improve, so Hunt was sent out to get some extra testing – during which something in the metering unit broke. This was fortunate as the Dutch Grand Prix did not have Sunday morning practice, so had it not been for those extra laps, the mechanical problems would have occurred during the race itself.

The race was delayed by rainstorms as the teams persuaded the organizers to let them run on wet tyres. Lauda led from Jody Scheckter whilst Vittorio Brambilla and Patrick Depailler collided. Jochen Mass was having metering unit troubles and Jacky Ickx exploded his engine. Meanwhile, Hunt had changed onto dry tyres and was gaining time rapidly on the drying surface to take the lead from Jarier and Lauda by lap 15. The Austrian championship leader was finding overtaking a very difficult prospect indeed. Emerson Fittipaldi dropped out with engine problems whilst John Watson broke a wing support and Carlos Reutemann got past Tom Pryce who was suffering from brake problems.

On lap 43, Jarier spun when a tyre burst. Lauda now pursued Hunt desperately for over 20 laps, putting him under immense pressure. Hunt had cracked under similar pressure in Buenos Aires, but this time he resisted. The Ferrari managed to gain on the slow corners, but Hunt pulled ahead on the fast corners and down the straight. The TV directors were so confused that the captions showed three laps left to go when a massive roar from the grandstands signalled it was all over. Hunt became the first Englishman since Peter Gethin to win a Grand Prix.

Lauda's second place reinforced his championship lead, which expanded to 13 points over Brabham driver Carlos Reutemann.

Classification

Qualifying

Race

Championship standings after the race

Drivers' Championship standings

Constructors' Championship standings

Note: Only the top five positions are included for both sets of standings. Only the best 6 results from the first 7 races and the best 6 results from the last 7 races counted towards the Championship. Numbers without parentheses are Championship points; numbers in parentheses are total points scored.

References

External links

Dutch Grand Prix
Dutch Grand Prix
Grand Prix
Dutch Grand Prix